Aventura Mall is a shopping mall located in Aventura, Florida. It is the 3rd largest mall in the United States by total square feet of retail space and the largest mall in Florida. The anchor stores are Bloomingdale's, Nordstrom, 2 Macy's stores, and JCPenney. The center is highlighted by a mix of over 300 stores. 

Aventura Mall has more than 50 eateries and restaurants, including Treats Food Hall, and the experiential Arts Aventura Mall program.

The Brightline Aventura Station, which opened in December 2022, is located across Biscayne Boulevard from the mall. A pedestrian bridge across Biscayne Blvd. is planned, to provide direct access to the mall from the station.  In the interim, Brightline is providing free shuttle bus service.

History
In April 1983, the Oxford Development Company, led by partners Donald Soffer, Edward J. Lewis, Mark E. Mason, Eugene Lebowitz, and Ray Parello officially dedicated Aventura Mall. There would be four anchors in the original, complex: Lord & Taylor, JCPenney (opened April 28, 1983), Sears (opened July 6, 1983, three weeks after another at Miami International Mall), and Macy's opened October 1, 1983.

On board as an original investor in the project was mall-developer Edward J. DeBartolo Sr. The mall was originally designed to accommodate a fifth anchor, and there was a section of drywall in a place where its mall entrance would be located.

Soon after its construction, Soffer left Oxford. As part of the break-up of assets, Soffer's new firm, Turnberry Associates assumed control of the Aventura Mall. In 1996, the DeBartolo Realty Corporation, which owned the minority interest once held by Edward J. DeBartolo, was acquired by Simon Property Group.

In 1996, the ground was broken for a major expansion of Aventura Mall. The addition, built onto the southeast end of the existing complex, consisted of a three-story atrium with an multiplex cinema and restaurants at a new entrance. A two-story Rainforest Cafe also opened, but was closed just a few years later, and it was replaced by a Zara. Part of the new development were two three-story parking garages surrounding the new anchor stores' southeast facades.

The Mall continued to expand, with major additions being added in November 1997 and August 1999. The mall underwent a $20 million renovation in late 2006. The mall expanded again in 2017 by opening a new three-level,  expansion wing.

In 2015, Sears Holdings spun of 235 of its properties, including the Sears at Aventura Mall, into Seritage Growth Properties.

In March 2019 Aventura Mall opened LEVEL THREE, a 25,000 square-foot venue designed by Carlos Zapata.

Incidents
On May 29, 2020, two people were taken to the Aventura Hospital after a shooting incident occurred in the Nordstrom part of the Aventura Mall.

On November 17, 2021, 3 people were shot and two others were injured in a shooting incident at the Aventura Mall. The shooter was arrested.

Current anchors
Macy's (Women's and Kids Fashion) (original tenant) (1983–present)
JCPenney (original tenant) (1983–present)
AMC Theatres (August 7, 1998–present)
Bloomingdales (1997–present)
Macy's (Men's and Home Furnishings) (2005–present)
Nordstrom (2008–present)

Former anchors
 Sears (original tenant) (1983–2017)
 Lord & Taylor (original tenant) (1983–2005)
 Burdines (1999–2004)
 Burdines-Macy's (2004–2005)

See also
List of shopping malls in South Florida
City of Aventura

References

External links

Shopping malls in Miami-Dade County, Florida
Shopping malls established in 1983
1983 establishments in Florida